Tara Hill may refer to 
Hill of Tara, County Meath, Ireland
Tara Hill, County Wexford, County Wexford, Ireland